Manousos Manousakis (Μανουσάκης, 

 is a well-known Greek director, producer, writer and actor. He was born in Athens, Greece on 14 January 1950. He studied at the London Film School. His spouse is named Maria and they have two children. He is a nephew of Irene Papas and first cousin of Aias Manthopoulos. He is an avid sailor and has won several regattas.

Filmography
Director:

2015:Cloudy Sunday
2007:Faros
2006:Gia tin Anna
2005:Kryfa monopatia
2004:Mi mou les adio
2003:To paihnidi tis sygnomis
2002:I agapi irthe apo makria
2001:Gia mia gynaika ki ena aftokinito
2000:Erotas kleftis
2000:Athoos i enohos
1999:Synora agapis
1998:Kokkinos drakos
1998:Agigma psyhis
1997:Psythiroi kardias
1996:Paliroia
1995:Oi dromoi tis polis
1994:Tavros me toxoti
1992:Tmima ithon
1991:Fakelos Amazon
1990:Nyhta Magon
1987:Antistrofi poreia
1987:Mikrografies
1986:Paraxeni synadisi
1985:I skiahtra
1977:Arhontes
1973:Vartholomaios

Producer:

2000:Athoos i enohos
1985:I skiahtra
1977:Arhontes
1973:Vartholomaios

Writer:

1998:Kokkinos drakos
1990:Nyhta Magon
1985:I skiahtra
1973:Vartholomaios

Actor:

1992:Tmima ithon
1984:Loafing and Camouflage (Λούφα και παραλλαγή)
1983:Homecoming Song ( Το τραγούδι της επιστροφής)
1981:Souvliste tous! Etsi tha paroume to kouradokastro

Second Unit Director or Assistant Director:

1978:Oi tembelides tis eforis koiladas

References

External links

1950 births
Sailors (sport) from Athens
Living people
Greek male television actors
Greek sailors
Greek film directors
Greek screenwriters
Alumni of the London Film School
Actors from Athens